Pseudaletis cornesi is a butterfly in the family Lycaenidae. It is found in Nigeria.

References

Endemic fauna of Nigeria
Butterflies described in 2007
Pseudaletis